Ertuğrul Oğuz Fırat (1 February 1923 in Malatya – 16 October 2014 in Ankara) was a Turkish composer, painter and poet.

Fırat graduated from Istanbul University with a degree in law in 1948 and held a career as a judge until his retirement in 1979.

All through his life, Fırat was involved in the arts: music, writing, painting.  He began to compose music and write his first poems and stories in the early 1940s, and took up painting in 1960.

Selected works
Several Fırat scores are published by Seesaw Music.

Stage
 Cambot Ardışı, Ballet Suite for chamber ensemble, Op. 7 (1956)
 Anadolu'da Çırakman Ateşleri, Ballet Suite No. 1 for orchestra, Op. 41 (1970–1975)
 Anadolu'da Çırakman Ateşleri, Ballet Suite No. 2 for mixed chorus and orchestra, Op. 47 (1979)
 Gerçek Simge Oyun (Reality, Symbol, Genre), Multimedia Ballet for narrator, chorus, instrumental ensemble (flute, 2 cellos, 2 pianos), and dancers, Op. 53 (1977–1978)

Orchestra
 Orkestra Konçertosu No. 1 (Concerto for Orchestra No. 1), Op. 16 (1962–1963)
 Anısal Kaynaklar No. 1 (Memorial Sources No. 1), Concerto Grosso, Op. 19 (1964)
 Üç Dans (3 Dances), Op. 20 (1947–1965, revised 1986)
 Karpuz Yiyen Eşek, Op. 21 (1965, revised 1976)
 Ve Sana Işığı Sorarlar for ensemble of winds and percussion, Op. 40 (1969)
 Büyülü ve Susuz Arayışlar, Orkestra Konçertosu No. 2 (Concerto for Orchestra No. 2), Version I, Op. 45 (1968–1973)
 Atatürk Savaşta ve Barışta (Atatürk in War and Peace) for chamber orchestra, Op. 49 (1973); original version for piano solo, Op. 30
 Türkiye (Turkey), 9 Pieces, Op. 51 (1976–1977)
 Küğ (Music) for harpsichord or piano and string orchestra, Op. 52 (1978)
 Büyülü ve Susuz Arayışlar, Orkestra Konçertosu No. 2 (Concerto for Orchestra No. 2), Version II, Op. 57 (1979–1980); revision of Op. 45
 Anısal Kaynaklar No. 2 (Memorial Sources No. 2), Op. 69 (1982)

Concertante
 Diriliş (Revival) for cello and orchestra, Op. 8 (1956, revised 1979)
 Ölümsüz Olana Ağıt, Concerto No. 1 for violin and orchestra, Op. 27 (1965–1967)
 Kaynak Sonunu Bekliyordu, Concerto No. 1 for viola and orchestra, Op. 28 (1967, revised 1975)
 Çoğul Yalnızlık, Concerto No. 2 for violin and orchestra, Op. 34 (1968, revised 1983)
 Kanıtsız Günlerin Oldusu (A Vision of Days Past), Concerto No. 2 for viola and orchestra, Op. 35 (1968)
 Uygar Çığlıklarla (With Civilized Cries; Avec des crís civilisés), Concerto for bassoon and chamber orchestra, Op. 39 (1968–1969)
 Yitmiş Işık Çizgisi Ardından, Uyanış, Atatürk'ün anısına (Upheaval following a Lost Ray of Light), Concerto No. 1 in Commemoration of Atatürk for piano and orchestra, Op. 46 (1969–1972)
 Bir Sevinin Devingen Dirim Düzeni, Concerto for organ and orchestra, Op. 54 (1971–1978)
 Korkaklığa, Sessizliğe ve Ölüme Karşı Yanıtdır, Concerto No. 2 for piano and orchestra, Op. 56 (1979)
 Yivcil Morun Seslenişi (Crís du violet en spiral), Concerto for clarinet and orchestra, Op. 58 (1980); original version for clarinet and piano, Op. 24 (1966, revised 1971)
 Uzak ve Yakın Çağrılar, Concerto for trumpet and orchestra, Op. 59 (1980)
 Dönüşümler, Triple Concerto for oboe, clarinet, bassoon and orchestra, Op. 62 (1980)
 Anadolu Mayası (Leaven of Anatolia), Symphony Concertante for bass clarinet and orchestra, Op. 72 (1984); original version for clarinet and piano, Op. 17 (1963, revised 1981); revised in 1988 as Op. 80
 1+2+3+4…Sonsuz, Concerto No.3 for violin and orchestra, Op. 73 (1984)
 Anadolu Mayası, Symphony Concertante for bass clarinet, cello and orchestra, Op. 80 (1988); original version for clarinet and piano, Op. 17
 Sevi Çığlıklarıyla Geçiyor for harpsichord and orchestra, Op. 82 (1991–1992)
 Coşku Basamakları, Triple Concerto for clarinet, bassoon, tuba and orchestra, Op. 94 (2001–2002)

Chamber music
 String Quartet No. 1 in F, Op. 1 (1945–1951)
 Trio No. 1 for violin, cello and piano, Op. 2 (1950–1951)
 Üçlü Sonat (Trio Sonata), Trio No. 2 for violin, clarinet and piano, Op. 2 (1953–1954)
 Eğlenceler (Amusements), 3 Short Pieces for clarinet and piano, Op. 4 (1954–1955)
 String Quartet No. 2, Op. 9 (1948–1950)
 String Quartet No. 3, Op. 10 (1954–1957); dedicated to Béla Bartók
 Sonatçık (Petite Sonata) for viola and piano, Op. 11 (1957–1958)
 Küçük Parçalar (Short Pieces) for viola and piano, Op. 12 (1956–1958)
 Devrimci Ortamda Sazların Cumhuriyeti, Trio No. 3 for flute, violin and piano), Op. 15 (1961, revised 1977)
 Anadolu Mayası for clarinet and piano, Op. 17 (1963, revised 1981); revised in 1984 for bass clarinet and orchestra, Op. 72
 Yivcil Morun Seslenişi (Crís du violet en spiral), Duo for clarinet (or violin) and piano, Op. 24 (1966, revised 1971); revised in 1980 for clarinet and orchestra, Op. 58
 Güneş Yaprakları, 9 Interconnected Pieces for cello and piano, Op. 26 (1967)
 Yokluk Evreninde Dönüşüm for violin and piano, Op. 29 (1966, revised 1968)
 Usançsız Tasarlama, 3 Pieces for cello and piano, Op. 31 (1967–1968)
 Ezgiler (Melodies), 4 Pieces for violin and piano, Op. 32 (1954–1968)
 Acı Gölgelerin Rastlantısında (In Coincidence of Sorrowful Shadows) for violin and piano, Op. 33 (1968, revised 1983)
 String Quartet No. 5, Op. 42 (1971, revised 1977); dedicated to Karol Szymanowski
 1+2+3+4…Sonsuz, String Quartet No. 6, Op. 44 (1971, revised 1978)
 Anadolu Güneşleri (Anatolian Suns), 3 Movements for oboe and piano, Op. 48 (1963–1973)
 Tohum ve Kıvılcımlar for wind quintet, Op. 60 (1980)
 Uyumsuzluğun Uyum Odakları for flute, oboe, clarinet, bassoon, Op. 63 (1981)
 Süreklilik ve Orantı for solo bassoon, clarinet, trombone, glockenspiel, xylophone, viola, and organ or piano, Op. 65 (1981)
 Tükenmezlik Ardında, Quartet for 2 clarinets, bassoon and harp (or piano), Op. 66 (1981)
 Nice Seslerden Sonra for double bass and piano, Op. 68 (1982)
 Yivcil Morun Seslenişi (Crís du violet en spiral), Version III for flute (or violin or clarinet) and piano, Op. 74 (1984)
 Bağımsız Çığırgılar Ardışı, Trio No. 5 for clarinet, viola and piano, Op. 75 (1985)
 Göm Alkışlarını Geçmişin, Trio No. 6 for violin, cello and piano, Op. 76 (1985)
 Ağıtsal Dördül, String Quartet No. 7, Op. 78 (1986)
 Kalabalık Beyin Sormakla Çoğalmış for flute (or violin) and organ (or piano, cello and double bass), Op. 83 (1991–1992)
 Azalan Işıkta, Karmakarışık, String Quartet No. 8, Op. 85 (1995)
 Kemancı Ustanın Büyü Kırını (The Master Violinist's Magic Dance) for violin solo, Op. 88 (1997–1999)
 Irkılın Büyü Kırını for violin, horn, harpsichord and organ, Op. 89 (1999)

Keyboard
 İki Piyano için Küğ (Music) for 2 pianos, Op. 22 (1965)
 Atatürk Savaşta ve Barışta (Atatürk in War and Peace) for piano, Op. 30 (1961–1968); also orchestrated as Op. 49
 Yerel Ezgiler Üzerine İmgesel Danslar, 6 Pieces for piano, Op. 36 (1964–1969, revised 1983)
 Bölünmüş Uzantı, 2 Movements for piano, Op. 37 (1968–1969)
 Bağımsızlık Tutkusuna Sonat (Passion of Independence), Sonata for piano, Op. 38 (1969)
 Piyano İçin Üç Parça (3 Pieces for Piano), Op. 50 (1970–1978, revised 1985)
 Değişmeye Artık Zaman Kalmadı, 3 Meditations for organ, Op. 70 (1982)
 Franz Liszt'i Anış for piano and added equipment, Op. 77 (1986)
 Cehennemde Bir Mevsim Çalınmalıdır for piano, Op. 79 (1986)
 Karanlığın İçyüzüne Dört Bakış, Sonata for piano, Op. 84 (1994)
 Piyano İçin Altı Bölüm (6 Movements for Piano), Op. 86 (1996–1997)
 Çembalo için Deneysel İki Parça (2 Experimental Pieces) for harpsichord, Op. 87 (1997–1999)
 Küğdeki Resimler (Pictures on Music), Series I, 5 Movements for piano, Op. 91 (2000–2001)
 Küğdeki Resimler (Pictures on Music), Series II, 5 Movements for piano, Op. 92 (2001)
 Özgürlük Direnci, 3 Pieces for harpsichord, Op. 93 (2001)

Vocal
 Zamanın Örümceği for soprano and orchestra, Op. 6 (1955, revised 1978)
 Ir ve Çalgılar için Küğ (Music for Voice and Instruments), Op. 13 (1957, revised 1961)
 Irsal Dördül (Vocal Quartet), String Quartet No. 4 for voice and string quartet, Op. 14 (1957, revised 1961)
 Umursanmamış (The Uncaring), Trio No. 4 for alto, violin, clarinet and piano, Op. 25 (1966, revised 1977)
 Bağımsız Şarkılar (Independent Songs), 5 Songs for bass and piano, Op. 18 (1963)
 İneğe Övgü for voice and small ensemble, Op. 23 (1965)
 Ölümlerde Çöl-Çığlık for two voices and orchestra, Op. 55 (1979)
 Dranas'ın Yırı üzerine Şarkı for baritone and ensemble, Op. 61 (1980)

Choral
 Şangırtı, Symphony No. 1 for soprano, tenor, mixed chorus and orchestra, Op. 5 (1955, revised 1978)
 Irsal Senfoni No. 2 (Vocal Symphony No. 2) for a cappella chorus, Op. 43 (1970, revised 1978)
 Atatürk (Version I), Oratorio (Symphony No. 3) for speaker, soloists, mixed chorus and orchestra, Op. 64 (1970–1981)
 Türkiye (Turkey), 6 Local Songs for chorus and ensemble, Op. 67 (1982)
 Atatürk (Version II), Oratorio for speaker, soloists, mixed chorus and orchestra, Op. 71 (1983–1984)
 Germencik Çığırgıları, 9 Pieces for a cappella children or youth chorus, Op. 81 (1989)
 Eşliksiz Koro için Çığırgılar for a cappella chorus, Op. 90 (1999–2000)

Literary works
 Karmakarışık Öyküler Kitabı (Tangled Stories), Metis Yayınları, 1995.
 Seviçıra: Şiirler / Yırlar (1943–1992), Doruk, 1997.
 Çağdaş Küğ Tarihi İçin İmler I (Remarks on the History of Modern Music I), Yapı Kredi Kültür Sanat Yayıncılık, 1999.
 Ertuğrul Oğuz Fırat: Retrospektif, Yapı Kredi Kültür Sanat Yayıncılık, 1999.
 Umursanmamış: 1951–1999 yazılar, Pan Yayıncılık, 1999.
 Yılların Bitimsiz Gücü: Şiir, Akar Ofset, 2001.

References

External links
  
 Ertuğrul Oğuz Fırat biography and gallery at Turkish Paintings

1923 births
2014 deaths
Turkish composers
Turkish painters
Turkish male poets
20th-century Turkish poets
Istanbul University Faculty of Law alumni
20th-century male writers